Lyle Wesley Waggoner (April 13, 1935 – March 17, 2020) was an American actor, sculptor, presenter, travel trailer salesman and model, known for his work on The Carol Burnett Show from 1967 to 1974 and for playing the role of Steve Trevor and Steve Trevor Jr. on Wonder Woman from 1975 to 1979. In his later career he founded a company, Star Waggons, which rented luxury trailers to studios.

Early life
Waggoner was born in Kansas City, Kansas on April 13, 1935, the son of Marie (Isern) and Myron Waggoner, and spent part of his childhood in Excelsior Springs, Missouri. On an episode of The Carol Burnett Show, Waggoner stated he had three sisters and one brother. In 1953, he graduated from Kirkwood High School in Kirkwood, Missouri, and then studied briefly at Washington University in St. Louis. He then joined the United States Army, serving two years in West Germany as a radio operator.

Following his military discharge, Waggoner studied mechanical engineering in the junior executive program at the General Motors Institute of Technology. He then sold encyclopedias as a door to door salesman. He made his acting debut as a muscle man in a Kansas City production of Li'l Abner, after which he created a sales promotion organization that enabled him to make enough money to finance a trip to Los Angeles to pursue his acting career.

Career
By the mid-1960s, Waggoner was appearing regularly in television and films, including an episode of Gunsmoke (“The Wishbone” in 1966).  He was a finalist for the title role in the TV series version of Batman, but lost the role to Adam West.

In 1967, he appeared in Catalina Caper (with Tommy Kirk, a former child actor trying to restart his career as a young adult), a film which would eventually be lampooned by Mystery Science Theater 3000. He also had a minor guest-starring role in the season-three episode "Deadliest of the Species" of the TV series Lost in Space.

Also in 1967, Waggoner began a seven-year stint on The Carol Burnett Show, a comedy sketch and variety show, on which he appeared as an announcer and performer. In 1973, Waggoner posed semi-nude for a Playgirl centerfold.  Waggoner left The Carol Burnett Show in 1974 in the hopes of advancing his career as a lead actor.  His spot on the show was filled by frequent guest star Tim Conway (and his role as announcer by Ernie Anderson). He later appeared on some of the show's reunion specials.

In 1976, Waggoner was appointed "mayor" of Encino, California, by the local chamber of commerce.  The "mayor" is not an actual government official as Encino is not an independent town but rather part of the city of Los Angeles; the post is an honorary "goodwill ambassador" position.  In addition to Waggoner, other holders of the title have included Steve Allen, Mike Connors, Fred Travalena, Ronnie Schell, and Cesare Danova.

A year after leaving Carol Burnett, Waggoner landed the role of Steve Trevor for the pilot and first season of the television series Wonder Woman starring Lynda Carter. Initially set during World War II, when the subsequent two seasons advanced the timeline to the 1970s, Waggoner played Steve Trevor, Jr.

Waggoner also appeared in several TV movies and minor motion pictures during the 1970s and 1980s, often cast for "hunk" appeal. He made guest appearances on numerous television series including Charlie's Angels, The San Pedro Beach Bums, Happy Days, Mork & Mindy, The Golden Girls, Ellen, and most recently The War at Home. Waggoner also played at least three roles on The Love Boat, Fantasy Island, and Murder, She Wrote throughout their respective runs.

In 1979, while working on Wonder Woman, Waggoner discovered that the motorhome he was using during the production was rented by the studio from a nearby resident. Waggoner soon bought a fleet of motor homes at $50,000 apiece, renting them out to Hollywood productions for $400-$500 per week. Soon after he founded Star Waggons, a company that leased customized location trailers for use by the entertainment industry. He also started Zio Studio Services, the rental arm of Star Waggons. On September 1, 2021, Star Waggons and Zio Studio Services were sold to Hudson Pacific Properties for $222 million. Waggoner's sons, Jason and Beau, will continue to run these businesses for Hudson Pacific Properties. Waggoner retired from full-time acting to run Star Waggons, but made occasional appearances, often parodying his earlier image (The Naked Truth, That '70s Show, and Return to the Batcave).
 
In 1990, Waggoner co-produced and appeared in a consumer-product show called Consumer America with co-host Shawn Bruner. The series featured novel national products from self-help to home goods and lasted for about two seasons.

In 1993, Waggoner was the host of an infomercial, "Let's Talk With Lyle Waggoner", which advertised "Y-Bron", supposedly a natural product that would cure male impotence. Scottsdale, Arizona based Twin Star was later fined $1.5 million for unsubstantiated claims about Y-Bron.

Personal life
Waggoner was married to Sharon Kennedy, an actress, financial consultant, and realtor. They married in 1961 and had two sons. He resided near Jackson, Wyoming, where he was a sculptor. His works can be seen at galleries in Jackson Hole, Wyoming, and Lander, Wyoming.

Death
Waggoner died in his home in the Los Angeles area at the age of 84 on March 17, 2020, from cancer.

Filmography

Film

Television

Theatre

References

Star Waggons, Zio Studio Services Sold to Hudson Pacific for $222M

External links

 
 
 

1935 births
2020 deaths
Male actors from Kansas City, Kansas
Male actors from Missouri
Military personnel from Kansas
American entertainment industry businesspeople
American male film actors
Place of death missing
American male television actors
American sketch comedians
Artists from Kansas
Deaths from cancer in California
20th-century American male actors
20th-century American businesspeople
21st-century American businesspeople
People from Excelsior Springs, Missouri
Businesspeople from Kansas
Businesspeople from Missouri
Comedians from Missouri
20th-century American comedians
21st-century American comedians
Playgirl Men of the Month